Mortonsville, also known as Martinsville, is an extinct small town in Forest Township, Clinton County, Indiana in the United States.  In 1860 it gained a post office with Martin Davis as the first postmaster and, though on a contract route and not appearing in the official list of U.S. post offices, served the community for a number of years.

When the Clover Leaf railroad was built through the township it bypassed Martinsville and established instead a station at Forest about two miles away, leading to the town's demise.

Geography
A 1913 history of Clinton County gives Martinsville's position as "at the northeast corner of section seventeen" in Forest Township.

References

Former populated places in Clinton County, Indiana
Ghost towns in Indiana